The Man with Two Faces is a 1975 South Korean horror film.

Cast
 Lee Ye-chun 
 Kim Ok-jin
 Jin Bong-jin

References

External links

1975 horror films
1975 films
South Korean horror films
1970s Korean-language films